Puzzle Challenge: Crosswords and More is a puzzle video game that has over 1,000 word and logic games. The puzzle games include crosswords, codebreakers, word searches (also mini and micro word searches), criss cross (also mini criss cross) and several others. As the player progresses, they can complete puzzles to unlock backdrops, audio tracks, and trophies.

2006 video games
Crave Entertainment games
North America-exclusive video games
PlayStation 2 games
PlayStation Portable games
Puzzle video games
Video games developed in the United Kingdom
Wii games
Multiplayer and single-player video games
Supersonic Software games